The Medal "For Labour Valour" was a civilian labour award of the Soviet Union bestowed to especially deserving workers to recognise and honour dedicated and valorous labour or significant contributions in the fields of science, culture or the manufacturing industry.  It was established on December 27, 1938 by decree of the Presidium of the Supreme Soviet of the USSR.  During its existence, its statute was amended three times by further decrees, first on June 19, 1943 to amend its description and ribbon, then on December 16, 1947 to amend its regulations, and finally on July 18, 1980 to confirm all previous amendments.  During its existence of just over fifty years, it was bestowed to almost two million deserving citizens.  The medal ceased to be awarded following the December 1991 dissolution of the Soviet Union.

Medal statute
The Medal "For Labour Valour" was awarded to workers, farmers, specialists of the national economy, workers of science, culture, education, health and other to citizens of the USSR, and in exceptional cases, to foreign nationals, for:
selfless and creative work, for surpassing norms, targets and socialist obligations, for increased productivity and improvements in product quality;
effective use of new technologies and the development of advanced technologies, for valuable innovations and rationalization proposals;
achievements in science, culture, literature, the arts, education, health, trade, catering, housing and communal services, public services, in other areas of employment;
fruitful work in the communist education and training of young people, for successful public and social activities;
achievements in the field of physical culture and sports.

The Medal "For Labour Valour" was worn on the left side of the chest and in the presence of other medals of the USSR, immediately after the Nakhimov Medal.  If worn in the presence of awards of the Russian Federation, the latter have precedence.

Medal description
The Medal "For Labour Valour" was a 34 mm in diameter (some struck in 1945 measured 35 mm) circular medal struck from .925 silver with a raised rim on both sides. In the upper obverse, a ruby-red enamelled 19.2 mm wide five pointed star with a silver hammer and sickle at its center.  Below the star, the inscription in two rows of sunken and red enamelled 2.8 mm high letters "FOR VALOUR LABOUR", at the very bottom, the relief inscription in 3.3 mm high letters "USSR".  On the otherwise plain reverse, the relief inscription on two rows of 2.5 mm high letters "LABOUR IN THE USSR - A MATTER OF HONOUR".

Early awards hung from a small triangular mount covered with a red ribbon with a threaded stub and screw for attachment to clothing.  Following the 1943 decree, the Medal "For Labour Valour" was secured by a ring through the medal suspension loop to a standard Soviet pentagonal mount covered by a 24mm wide lilac coloured silk moiré ribbon with 2 mm wide red edge stripes.

Recipients (partial list)
The first investiture took place on January 15, 1939 where the Medal "For Labour Valour" was presented to 22 employees of the Kalinin armaments plant number 8 for exceptional service to the country in the creation and development of new weapons for the Workers' and Peasants' Red Army.

The individuals below were recipients of the Medal "For Labour Valour".

Olympic medalist and "Master of Sport" Vladimir Aliverovich Nazlymov
Geochemist, academician and "Hero of Socialist Labour" Nikolay Vasilyevich Belov
Actor and clown, "People's Artist of the USSR" and "Hero of Socialist Labour" Yuri Vladimirovich Nikulin
Olympic medalist and "Master of Sports" Vladimir Mikhaylovich Barnashov
Chairman of the Soviet and then Russian Central Bank Viktor Vladimirovich Gerashchenko
Artillery specialist and strategist Ivan Fedorovich Ladyga
Actor, director, artist, designer, puppet-maker, master puppeteer Nikolai Viktorovich Zykov
Rocket engineer and spacecraft designer Sergei Pavlovich Korolev
Mathematician and physician Sergey Pavlovich Kurdyumov
Ice Hockey Olympic medalist Nikolai Mikhailovich Sologubov
Writer and author Chingiz Akif oglu Abdullayev
Chess grandmaster Yuri Lvovich Averbakh
Olympic medalist gymnast Nikolai Yefimovich Andrianov
Scientist and linguist Gabdulkhay Khuramovich Akhatov
Actress "People's Artist of the USSR" Zhanneta "Zhanna" Trofymovna Prokhorenko
President of the World Meteorological Organization Alexander Ivanovich Bedritsky
Olympic medalist ski jumper "Master of Sport" Vladimir Pavlovich Belousov
General Secretary of the Communist Party of the Soviet Union Mikhail Sergeyevich Gorbachev
Physicist "Hero of Socialist Labour" Alexander Sergeevich Davydov
Army General Viktor Fyodorovich Yerin
Aircraft designer and organizer of the aircraft industry Victor Yakovlevich Litvinov
Scholar and foremost expert in Old Russian language and literature Dmitry Sergeyevich Likhachov
Hockey legend goaltender Vladislav Aleksandrovich Tretiak
Doctor of Military and Technical Sciences General Elguja Viktorovich Medzmariashvili
Former electrical engineer President of Mordovia Nikolay Ivanovich Merkushkin
Theatre and film actor "People's Artist" Andrei Alexandrovich Mironov
Ice hockey Olympic medalist Vladimir Vladimirovich Petrov
Archaeologist and historian Svetlana Alexandrovna Pletneva
Former agronomist and President of Moldova Mircea Ion Snegur
Theoretical physicist Arseny Alexandrovich Sokolov
Aircraft engine designer Dr. Pavel Aleksandrovich Soloviev
Composer of stage, orchestral, chamber, and choral works Yevhen Fedorovych Stankovych
Champion Olympic biathlete Alexander Ivanovich Tikhonov
Linguist and philologist Akaki Gavrilovich Shanidze
Chairwoman of the Presidium of the Supreme Soviet of the Dagestan ASSR Roza Abdulbasirovna Eldarova
Kyrgyz poet Jolon Mamytov
Master builder Zukhra Valeeva

See also
Orders, decorations, and medals of the Soviet Union

References

External links
Legal Library of the USSR
The Russian Gazette

Civil awards and decorations of the Soviet Union
Awards established in 1938
Awards disestablished in 1991
1938 establishments in the Soviet Union
1991 disestablishments in the Soviet Union